Cao Zhenxiu (1762–?) was a Chinese calligrapher. She was from 1782 married to the official and calligrapher Wang Qisun. She was known as the best female calligrapher in China of her time, and it was common for those ordering calligraphy from her spouse to order from her as well.

See also
List of Female Calligraphers

References 
 Lily Xiao Hong Lee, Clara Lau, A.D. Stefanowska: Biographical Dictionary of Chinese Women: v. 1: The Qing Period, 1644-1911 

18th-century Chinese calligraphers
Women calligraphers
1762 births
Year of death unknown
18th-century Chinese women artists